The Zamboanga sphenomorphus (Tytthoscincus atrigularis) is a species of skink. It is endemic to the Philippines.

References

atrigularis
Endemic fauna of the Philippines
Reptiles of the Philippines
Reptiles described in 1908
Taxa named by Leonhard Stejneger